Kalateh-ye Shir (also Romanized as Kalāteh-ye Shīr; also known as Kalāt-e Shīr, Kalāteh-ye Shīr, Kalāt-e Shir, Estakhr-e Derāz, Shīr, and Shīr-e Bālā) is a village in Doreh Rural District, in the Central District of Sarbisheh County, South Khorasan Province, Iran. At the 2006 census, its population was 97, in 26 families.

References 

Populated places in Sarbisheh County